The Evergreen Point Floating Bridge, officially the Governor Albert D. Rosellini Bridge, and commonly called the SR 520 Bridge or 520 Bridge, was a floating bridge in the U.S. state of Washington that carried State Route 520 across Lake Washington, connecting Medina with the Montlake/Union Bay district of Seattle.

The bridge was named for Evergreen Point, the westernmost of the three small Eastside peninsulas that SR 520 crosses. (The other two are Hunts Point and Yarrow Point.) In 1988, it was renamed for the state's 15th governor, Albert D. Rosellini, who had advocated its construction.

Although there were plans to replace the bridge several years following its completion, it was not until much later that investigations revealed the aging bridge to be in poor condition and unable to withstand the major hazards for which it was originally designed. This finding may have accelerated plans to finally replace it. In response to these hazards and the need to expand the current infrastructure, construction on a replacement began in 2012; the new bridge opened in April 2016. The original bridge was closed to traffic on April 22, 2016.

History

The bridge was opened for commuter traffic on August 28, 1963, after three years of construction. It was built as a four-lane toll bridge to provide easy access from Seattle to Eastside communities such as Bellevue, Kirkland, and Redmond. The total cost of the bridge, in 1961 dollars, was $21 million (at least $127 million in 2011 dollars). To make up for this cost, commuters paid a 35-cent toll in each direction until 1979. The toll booths were then converted into bus stops.

The bridge affected many communities on the Eastside. Redmond's population saw a dramatic increase, jumping from less than 1,500 in 1960 to 11,000 in 1970. It was the second floating bridge to cross Lake Washington; the first was the Lake Washington Floating Bridge, built in 1940 as part of U.S. Route 10, later part of Interstate 90, which at its construction was the largest floating structure ever built.

On August 28, 1988, the bridge was officially renamed for governor Albert D. Rosellini; the Washington State Transportation Commission approved of the renaming three days earlier ahead of the bridge's 25th anniversary celebration. At the time, 109,000 vehicles used the bridge on an average day and 529 million vehicles were estimated to have crossed it since it opened.

Drawspan opening
The bridge was built with a drawspan in the center that could open for boats too tall to go under the bridge.

In 1989, an electrical fault caused the drawspan to open during rush hour, causing one death and five injuries. In 2000, a gravel barge struck the bridge.

Replacement bridge

Just five years after the bridge opened, a study commissioned by the state legislature was completed to figure out how to provide for the great demand for cross-lake transportation. That study evaluated bridge and tunnel crossings north and south of the bridge. Other plans considered in the late 1980s proposed the addition of rail transit or bus lanes to add capacity. To prepare a case for the state legislature, the Trans-Lake Study was commissioned to study various alternatives. The study brought together 47 representatives of public agencies, neighborhoods, businesses, and advocacy interests.

In 1997, Myint Lwin, WSDOT's chief bridge engineer, said that even with repairs, the bridge could be expected to last only about twenty more years (until 2017). The bridge needed to be closed to traffic in high winds, and even after a seismic retrofit in 1999, it was at risk of collapse during an earthquake. Due to the weight of various reinforcements over the years, the bridge deck ultimately sat about  lower over the water than it did originally.

Since the bridge was built in the early 1960s, prior to the implementation of modern earthquake standards, its hollow support structures would have likely failed during a major earthquake. Additionally, vibrations induced by storm surges and strong winds could have compromised the drawspan, anchor cables, and pontoons, subjecting them to structural failure. Even for storms below the maximum threshold for failure to occur, Washington State Department of Transportation (WSDOT) still closed the floating bridge to traffic. The original bridge carried two lanes of traffic in each direction, but did not include emergency shoulders or pedestrian and bicycle crossings. This posed traffic problems since any obstruction caused by car breakdown, wreck or maintenance would result in traffic backups.

In 2011, WSDOT broke ground on the replacement bridge. On April 2, 2016, WSDOT held a grand opening ceremony, allowing the public to explore the top deck of the new bridge on the westbound side. The replacement bridge opened to westbound traffic on April 11, 2016, and opened to eastbound traffic on April 25, 2016. The old bridge was permanently closed at 23:00 PDT on April 22, 2016, with demolition completed by the end of 2016. The bridge was removed by spring 2017.

Construction

The cost of all improvements to SR-520 between I-5 and I-405, including the new bridge, is forecast to be $4.65 billion.

The first of 21 longitudinal pontoons were positioned on August 11, 2012. The pontoons were constructed in Aberdeen by Kiewit Construction. Pontoon construction was plagued by errors and shoddy construction. Reports included workers installing incorrectly sized rebar, installing it in the wrong location, and even having it missing altogether. Workers also poured concrete in weather that was too wet or too cold. Several of the new pontoons have had problems with cracking, which has been blamed on Kiewit's poor work. An independent auditor stated that there had been a long-running pattern of poor-quality work and that WSDOT failed to force Kiewit to take corrective actions. An inspector for the construction called it a disaster waiting to happen, adding "I won't drive across that bridge when they have it built."

By the end of February 2015, enough of the new bridge was in place to block tall ships that used to pass through a drawspan in the Rosellini Bridge. In early July 2015, the westernmost floating pontoon was moved to make room for the installation of the west end of the bridge; on July 8, 2015, all longitudinal pontoons for the new bridge were in place.

Tolling
When the bridge opened in 1963, a 35 cent toll was collected to pay off a construction bond. The sole toll plaza was located at the east end of the bridge in Medina and had nine booths. The state government offered discounts to commuters using a ticket book, as well as carpools of two or more people. The toll was retired on June 22, 1979, after the $35 million bond had been paid off 20 years ahead of schedule. More than 213 million vehicles had used the toll bridge and generated $59.6 million in revenue.

Tolls were reinstated in December 2011 to fund the original bridge's replacement. Within the first year, traffic levels declined by 30 percent and tolls generated $50 million in gross revenue.

To fund the new bridge, in May 2009, Governor Christine Gregoire signed ESHB 2211, which authorized tolling on the SR 520 bridge beginning in 2010. Tolling actually began on December 29, 2011 and has assisted WSDOT in funding the project. The State Transportation Commission has proposed a toll of US$3.59 each way during peak periods. The proposed rates during other hours were to range from $0 to $2.87.

All tolling was done automatically with no tollbooths. Tolling for people without "Good to Go" passes is done by license plates. Toll readers were located on gantries at the east highrise, but additional gantries on the east mainland were added to facilitate tolling on the new bridge once opened.

Tim Eyman promoted Initiative 1125, which among other measures, would have banned the time-of-day tolling proposed for the bridge, required funding to be used on the road that collected the toll, and required tolls to be set by elected officials. The initiative was defeated by Washington voters.

See also
List of bridges documented by the Historic American Engineering Record in Washington (state)

References

External links

Bridge camera (includes some weather data)
Department of Transportation photo gallery

1963 establishments in Washington (state)
Bridges completed in 1963
Bridges in King County, Washington
Bridges in Seattle
Historic American Engineering Record in Washington (state)
Moveable bridges in the United States
Pontoon bridges in the United States
Retractable bridges
Road bridges in Washington (state)
Seattle metropolitan area
Steel bridges in the United States
Toll bridges in Washington (state)